Edmund Perry Hanson (August 14, 1889 – January 11, 1953) was an American politician and a veteran of World War I from the state of Iowa.

Hanson was born in Iroquois County, Illinois in 1889. He grew up on a farm near Dean, Iowa. He graduated from Moulton High School in 1907 and afterwards from Iowa State University. He served as a Republican for one term in the Iowa House of Representatives from January 14, 1935, to January 10, 1937. Hanson died in Centerville, Appanoose County, Iowa in 1953. He was interred in Oakland Cemetery in Centerville.

References

1889 births
1953 deaths
20th-century American politicians
Republican Party members of the Iowa House of Representatives
Iowa State University alumni
People from Appanoose County, Iowa
People from Iroquois County, Illinois
Military personnel from Iowa